The 2007 Solheim Cup was the tenth Solheim Cup, held 14–16 September at Halmstad GK in Halmstad, Sweden. It was a three-day contest for professional female golfers, pitting the 12 best players born in the United States against the 12 best players born in Europe. The U.S. team won the competition, 16 to 12, to retain the Solheim Cup.

Format
The Solheim Cup is a match play event, as opposed to the more common stroke play format. A total of 28 points are available, divided among four periods of team play, followed by one period of singles play. The first period, on Friday morning, consists of four rounds of foursomes. This is followed in the afternoon by four rounds of four-ball. This schedule is repeated on Saturday morning and afternoon. The four periods on Friday and Saturday account for 16 points. During these team periods, the players play in teams of two. The captain of each team can play a player as many or as few times as she desires. The final 12 points are decided in a round of singles match play, in which all 24 players (12 from each team) take part.

Teams
The European and United States teams were selected by different methods.

The European Team was selected by taking the top five players from the LET Solheim Cup standings, followed by the top four European LET members on the Rolex Women’s World Rankings at the agreed cut off date who were not already qualified via The Solheim Cup standings, and three captain’s selections. Qualifying points for the European Team are awarded weekly to the top-10 finishers at official LET events.

The U.S. Team qualified by earning points for wins and for top-20 finishes on the LPGA Tour over a two-year period. Points were earned beginning with the 2005 State Farm Classic and concluding with the 2007 Safeway Classic. The ten players with the highest points were automatically selected for the Team. Two additional players were selected by captain Betsy King after the Safeway Classic on August 26, 2007.

*Residence/Hometown according to official Solheim Cup designation.
LET rankings as of August 19, 2007
Rolex rankings as of August 20, 2007

*Residence/Hometown according to official Solheim Cup designation.
Rolex rankings as of August 20, 2007. Rolex ranking does not factor into US Team selection. Shown for comparison purposes only.

Day one
Friday, 14 September 2007

Morning foursomes

Afternoon fourball

Day two
Saturday, 15 September 2007

Morning foursomes

Afternoon fourball

Day three
Sunday, 16 September 2007

Singles

Individual player records
Each entry refers to the win–loss–half record of the player.

Europe

United States

See also
2007 in golf

External links
Official Solheim Cup web site
Official LPGA Solheim Cup web site

Solheim Cup
Golf tournaments in Sweden
International sports competitions hosted by Sweden
Sports competitions in Halmstad
Solheim Cup
Solheim Cup
Solheim Cup